Sheep Mountain Range Archeological District is an archeological site, located in Clark County, Nevada, and listed on the National Register of Historic Places.  The site is currently an underwater conservation area.

Archeologist W. Geoffrey Spaulding discovered yucca remains and macrofossils of piñon nuts (Pinus monophylla) at the site in pack rat waste that date between 1990–5210 BP.

See also 
 Clovis culture
 Indigenous peoples of the Great Basin

Notes

References
 Lyneis, Margaret M. "Prehistoric Southern Nevada Study Units."

Native American history of Nevada
Archaeological sites on the National Register of Historic Places in Nevada
National Register of Historic Places in Clark County, Nevada
Historic districts on the National Register of Historic Places in Nevada